Julien Wanders (born 18 March 1996) is a Swiss long-distance runner. He currently holds the European record for the half marathon with a time of 59:13, which was set at the Ras Al Khaimah Half Marathon in 2019 and the European record for the 10K run, with a time of 27:13 set in Valencia on January 12, 2020.

Wanders spends about half the year training in Iten, Kenya, and the other half training in Europe.

Competition record

Personal records

References

External links 
Official website

 Christof Gertsch: Der Kenianer. Porträt in: Das Magazin Nr. 33, 17. August 2019, S. 16–26.

1996 births
Living people
Sportspeople from Geneva
Swiss male long-distance runners
World Athletics Championships athletes for Switzerland
Athletes (track and field) at the 2020 Summer Olympics
Olympic athletes of Switzerland
20th-century Swiss people
21st-century Swiss people